Martin Welles (December 7, 1787 – January 19, 1863) was an American politician.

Welles, son of Gen. Roger Welles, an officer in the Continental Army, and Jemima (Kellogg) Welles, was born in Wethersfield, Connecticut, December 7, 1787, where he resided during most of his life.

He graduated from Yale College in 1806. Having studied Law with Samuel Cowles, Esq., of Farmington, Connecticut, he opened an office in that place. Subsequently he was admitted to the bar in the State of New York, and began to practice his profession first at Newburgh, New York, and afterwards in New York City. His health failing he returned to his native place, and refrained for a time from professional activity.  During this period he interested himself in planning and superintending the Connecticut State Prison, in the establishment of which at Wethersfield he was the chief instrument.

He was chosen to the Connecticut House of Representatives in 1824, 5, 6, 7, and also in 1831 and 2. During the first three years of his membership he was Clerk, and during the last two he was Speaker of that body. In 1827, 8 and 9, he was a member of the Connecticut State Senate, being in 1827 elected to both Houses. While a Senator he was a member of the Corporation of Yale College. He was also an associate Judge on the bench of the Hartford County Court.

He married Fanny, daughter of Reuben S. Norton, of Farmington.  During the last fifteen years of his life he was engaged with energy and success in the practice of his profession in Hartford. His death occurred at Martin, Ohio, January 19, 1863, at the age of 76 years.

Speakers of the Connecticut House of Representatives
Members of the Connecticut House of Representatives
Connecticut state senators
1787 births
1863 deaths
People from Wethersfield, Connecticut
New York (state) lawyers
Yale College alumni
19th-century American politicians
19th-century American lawyers